Franck Gilard (born November 1, 1950 in Riaillé, Loire-Atlantique) was a member of the National Assembly of France from 2002 to 2017, representing the 5th constituency of the Eure department, as a member of the Union for a Popular Movement.

He also belonged to the Club de l'horloge.

References

Carrefour de l'horloge people
1950 births
Living people
People from Loire-Atlantique
Union for a Popular Movement politicians
The Popular Right
Deputies of the 12th National Assembly of the French Fifth Republic
Deputies of the 13th National Assembly of the French Fifth Republic
Deputies of the 14th National Assembly of the French Fifth Republic